Negative Population Growth is an organization in the United States, founded in 1972.

NPG works on overpopulation issues and advocates a gradual reduction in U.S. and world population.  NPG believes the optimal population for the United States is 150 to 200 million and that the optimal world population is two to three billion.  In order to accomplish their goal of a smaller U.S. population, the organization promotes policies which would reduce the fertility rate in the U.S. to 1.5 births per woman, and they advocate for reducing the level of immigration into the United States to 100,000 to 200,000 per year from the existing level of over 1.5 million per year.

Membership stands at more than 25,000.

See also
 Agriculture and population limits
 Criticisms of globalization
 List of population concern organizations
 Malthusian catastrophe
 Over-consumption
 Overpopulation
 Population Connection
 Sustainability
 The Limits to Growth
 The Revenge of Gaia
 Voluntary Human Extinction Movement

References

External links
 Official site

1972 establishments in the United States
Immigration political advocacy groups in the United States
Environmental organizations based in the United States
Organizations established in 1972
Population concern advocacy groups
Sustainability organizations